Found Alive is a 1933 American pre-Code drama film directed by Charles Hutchison and starring Barbara Bedford, Maurice Murphy and Robert Frazer.

The film's sets were designed by the art director Paul Palmentola.

Cast
 Barbara Bedford as Edith Roberts 
 Maurice Murphy as Bobby Roberts 
 Robert Frazer as Harry Roberts 
 Edwin Cross as Brooke, the Butler 
 Ernie Adams as C.S. King, Hunter 
 Audrey Telley as Audrey 
 Cy Ceeder as Cy 
 Gordon De Main as Attorney 
 Henry Hall as Judge 
 'Snake' King as Snake 
 Stella Zerco as Stella

References

Bibliography
 Michael R. Pitts. Poverty Row Studios, 1929–1940: An Illustrated History of 55 Independent Film Companies, with a Filmography for Each. McFarland & Company, 2005.

External links
 

1933 films
1933 drama films
American drama films
Films directed by Charles Hutchison
1930s English-language films
1930s American films